Herbert Kaufmann (24 August 1920 – 27 November 1976) was a German Ethnologist, journalist, photographer and writer. He is known for his body of work concerning Africa, particularly – in the English-speaking world – his translated novel, Red Moon and High Summer (translated 2006), an adventure story set among the Tuaregs. The original German edition, Roter Mond und Heiße Zeit (1957), won the 1958 Deutscher Jugendliteraturpreis.

Work
Afrika, 1954
Der verlorene Karawanenweg (also published as Die Hammelpiste), Graz u. a. 1955 (novel)
Kongo zwischen gestern und morgen, Murnau 1956
Der Teufel tanzt im Ju-Ju-Busch, Graz u. a. 1956 (novel)
Roter Mond und Heiße Zeit, Graz u. a. 1957 (novel)
Die Stadt unter dem Wüstensand, Graz u. a. 1957 (novel)
Nigeria, Bonn 1958
Reiten durch Iforas, München 1958 (illustrated travelogue)
Sulei, der kleine Negerjunge, Köln u. a. 1958 (together with Gerty Kaufmann)
Belgisch Kongo und Ruanda-Urundi, Bonn 1959
Des Königs Krokodil, Köln u. a. 1959 (novel)
Pfeile und Flöten, Graz u. a. 1960 (novel)
La piste perdue. Paris 1960 (French translation of Der verlorene Karawanenweg)
Äthiopien, Bonn 1962
Dein neuer Nachbar in Afrika, Düsseldorf 1962
Afrikas Weg in die Gegenwart, Braunschweig 1963
Wirtschafts- und Sozialstruktur der Iforas-Tuareg, Köln 1964 (Doctorate)
Tule Tiptops merkwürdige Reise, Graz u. a. 1977
Red Moon and High Summer. London 2006  (English translation of Roter Mond und Heiße Zeit).

References

1920 births
1976 deaths
German male writers